Šarović is a surname. Notable people with the surname include:

Darko Šarović (born 1990), Serbian physician and athlete
Mirko Šarović (born 1956), politician from Bosnia and Herzegovina
Nemanja Šarović (born 1974), politician from Serbia

Serbian surnames